Hans Christian Enehov Karlsson (born 20 September 1969) is a Swedish former professional footballer who played as a defender. He is best remembered for representing Trelleborgs FF, Malmö FF, IFK Göteborg, Esbjerg fB, and AB during a career that spanned between 1985 and 2004. A full international between 1996 and 1997, he won eight caps for the Sweden national team.

Career statistics

International

References

1969 births
Living people
Association football defenders
Swedish footballers
Allsvenskan players
Danish Superliga players
Trelleborgs FF players
Malmö FF players
IFK Göteborg players
Esbjerg fB players
Akademisk Boldklub players
Swedish expatriate footballers
Expatriate men's footballers in Denmark
Swedish expatriate sportspeople in Denmark
Sweden international footballers